Carl Thomas Mustain (1911–1996) was an American educator and politician.

Mustain, a school superintendent, served a single term in the Oklahoma House of Representatives in 1955. He was preceded and succeeded in office by Wiley Sparkman. Mustain died at the age of 84 on June 8, 1996.

References

1911 births
1996 deaths
School superintendents in Oklahoma
Democratic Party members of the Oklahoma House of Representatives
20th-century American politicians